A detrainment device is equipment on a rail vehicle that provides an evacuation route for the passengers.  It usually consists of a set of steps or a ramp, located at a doorway, allowing passengers to leave the vehicle in an emergency, vehicle breakdown or accident.

A detrainment device is moved from a stored location into an operational position, usually above the coupler at the end of a passenger car.  A detrainment device may consist of a manually placed, hinged, foldable or telescopic ladder or ramp.  A detrainment device may allow evacuation to track level, or to a coupled railcar. A detrainment device may be fitted with handrails.

In other cases, evacuation may be via the vehicle passenger side doors to a trackside walkway in a tunnel, without the use of a detrainment device.

Types 

Examples of the main types of detrainment device currently in service include:

Steps, stored loose inside the driver's cab or the passenger saloon
 Historically the most common arrangement

Hinged steps, stored inside the driver's cab or the passenger saloon
 London Underground S Stock

Steps, folding, hinging or sliding out from the doorway
 London Underground 1973 Stock (refurbished)
 London Underground 1996 Stock
 British Rail Class 378

Ramp, sliding out from below the doorway
 London Underground 1992 Stock
 Manila Line 2 Stock

Ramp, folding out from the doorway
 MTR Metro Cammell EMU
 MTR Metro Cammell EMU (Disneyland Resort line) stock 
 Kawasaki Heavy Industries C151, Siemens C651, Kawasaki Heavy Industries & Nippon Sharyo C751B, Kawasaki Heavy Industries & CSR Sifang C151A
 Delhi Metro RS2 and RS3 
 Alstom Metropolis C751A – North East line
 PNR 203 Series EMU, Khia 52 Trains, JR 12/14 Series (Ladder Only)
 Hyundai-Rotem MTR K-Stock EMU
 Kaohsiung Mass Rapid Transit
 MTR Corporation -MTR Corporation C-Train EMU

Tensioned Fabric ramp, deploying from the doorway
 MTR Corporation Airport Express A-Stock EMU
 Siemens Modular Metro and Bombardier Changchun Coaches – Bangkok BTS Skytrain
 KTM Train Coaches (even Tiger Trains)
 Bombardier MOVIA C951 - Downtown line
 Alstom Metropolis C830 – Circle line
 Alstom Metropolis C751C
 Alstom Metropolis C830C
 Alstom Metropolis Barcelona Metro line 9

Performance 

User trials on prototype equipment in controlled conditions have indicated that a wide detrainment ramp will allow the evacuation of 2500 passengers in 28 minutes if the ramp, its handrails and the cab and saloon throughways are correctly specified.  Modern detrainment step systems can detrain one person every two seconds.

See also
 Evacuation slide

References

External links 
 YouTube video: How to deploy the emergency detrainment door on the North East Line (Alstom Metropolis C751A)
 Toronto Rocket detrainment device

Passenger rail rolling stock
Railway safety